Fayston  is a town in Washington County, Vermont, United States. The population was 1,364 at the 2020 census.

History
The town was chartered in 1788 and sold to a speculator.  The town was organized in 1805. The Mad River Glen ski area, located in Fayston on Stark Mountain, was founded in 1947. The town was home to a small one room school house as well as several family farmers and maple producers, which contributed to the town's economic growth and stability.

Geography
According to the United States Census Bureau, the town has a total area of 36.5 square miles (94.5 km2), all land. The town is located in the Mad River valley and is south of Camel's Hump State Park. Fayston is located on Vermont Route 17. Burnt Rock Mountain is located in Fayston.

Demographics

As of the census of 2000, there were 1,141 people, 484 households, and 312 families residing in the town.  The population density was 31.3 people per square mile (12.1/km2).  There were 900 housing units at an average density of 24.7 per square mile (9.5/km2).  The racial makeup of the town was 98.25% White, 0.53% African American, 0.18% Native American, 0.09% Asian, and 0.96% from two or more races. Hispanic or Latino of any race were 0.96% of the population.

There were 484 households, out of which 30.4% had children under the age of 18 living with them, 56.4% were married couples living together, 6.4% had a female householder with no husband present, and 35.5% were non-families. 25.0% of all households were made up of individuals, and 5.6% had someone living alone who was 65 years of age or older.  The average household size was 2.36 and the average family size was 2.85.

In the town, the population was spread out, with 22.8% under the age of 18, 5.7% from 18 to 24, 33.2% from 25 to 44, 28.7% from 45 to 64, and 9.6% who were 65 years of age or older.  The median age was 39 years. For every 100 females, there were 103.0 males.  For every 100 females age 18 and over, there were 101.6 males.

The median income for a household in the town was $53,472, and the median income for a family was $60,938. Males had a median income of $35,139 versus $26,852 for females. The per capita income for the town was $28,196.  About 2.9% of families and 5.5% of the population were below the poverty line, including 4.3% of those under age 18 and 5.6% of those age 65 or over.

References

External links
 
 Town of Fayston official website
A history of Fayston

 
Towns in Vermont
Towns in Washington County, Vermont